Desclos is a surname. Notable people with the surname include: 

Anne Desclos (1907–1998), French journalist and novelist
Laurent Desclos, American electrical engineer